Marc Joseph Denis Bureau (born May 19, 1966) is a Canadian former ice hockey centre who played in the National Hockey League for the Calgary Flames, Minnesota North Stars, Tampa Bay Lightning, Montreal Canadiens and Philadelphia Flyers.

Career
In his prime, Bureau was considered in the upper echelon of defensive centres in the NHL. Never drafted by an NHL team, he was signed as a free agent by the Calgary Flames after scoring 54 goals for the Longueuil Chevaliers in 1986-87. With Calgary's logjam at the centre position, Bureau was traded to Minnesota for a third round choice (Sandy McCarthy) in 1991. He was claimed by the newly formed Tampa Bay Lightning in the 1992 NHL Expansion Draft, where he would enjoy his most successful years in the NHL. In 1995 he was traded to the Montreal Canadiens for veteran forward Brian Bellows.

Bureau was injured in practice as a member of the AHL's Saint John Flames in October 2000 and did not play again.

Bureau was a frequent guest commentator on the V nightly sports show L'attaque à 5.

Career statistics

Regular season and playoffs

References

External links
 

1966 births
Living people
Calgary Flames players
Canadian ice hockey centres
Chicoutimi Saguenéens (QMJHL) players
Granby Bisons players
Sportspeople from Trois-Rivières
Kalamazoo Wings (1974–2000) players
Longueuil Chevaliers players
Minnesota North Stars players
Montreal Canadiens players
Philadelphia Flyers players
Saint John Flames players
Salt Lake Golden Eagles (IHL) players
Tampa Bay Lightning players
Undrafted National Hockey League players
Ice hockey people from Quebec